The Brawl to End It All was a professional wrestling event produced by the World Wrestling Federation (WWF) and broadcast live on MTV. It took place at Madison Square Garden in New York, New York on July 23, 1984. The show was a major event in the Rock 'n' Wrestling Connection in the mid-1980s WWF, and began a storyline that ultimately culminated in the first WrestleMania. The main event featured The Fabulous Moolah defending the WWF Women's Championship against Wendi Richter. Richter pinned Moolah to win the Women's Championship. It was the only match of the event that was shown on national television (on MTV). In the main event from closed-circuit television Hulk Hogan pinned Greg Valentine to retain the WWF World Heavyweight Championship]. The entire event was recorded and shown on the Madison Square Garden Network however.

On September 5, 2019 the entire show was added to the WWE Network in their "Hidden Gems" section, however the next day it was removed.

Background
Captain Lou Albano, a wrestling manager, appeared in Cyndi Lauper's 1983 music video for "Girls Just Want to Have Fun". This led to a scripted wrestling storyline in which Albano's sexism angered Lauper. Albano and Lauper appeared on WWF television programs to voice their anger at each other. Eventually, it was decided that the feud would be settled in a wrestling match. Lauper chose WWF female wrestler Wendi Richter to represent her, while Albano managed The Fabulous Moolah, who had held the WWF Women's Championship for almost 28 years.

Event

Although the event consisted of eleven matches, only the Richter vs. Moolah match was shown on television and Hogan vs. Valentine was shown on Closed Circuit Television. Several championships were defended on the card. Adrian Adonis and Dick Murdoch retained their WWF Tag Team Championship against Sgt. Slaughter and Terry Daniels. Antonio Inoki, the WWF World Martial Arts Heavyweight Champion won two matches at the event, as he retained his championship against Charlie Fulton and later won a 20-man battle royal.

In the main event match from closed-circuit television, Hogan pinned Valentine to retain the WWF World Heavyweight Championship. While in the main event match from MTV, Richter pinned Moolah and was awarded the WWF Women's Championship.

The event had a 9.0 Nielsen rating, which made it the most-watched program in the history of MTV.

Aftermath
On February 18, 1985, the WWF promoted another wrestling event, The War to Settle the Score, on MTV. Lauper was involved again, as she intervened in the main event match that saw Hulk Hogan defend his WWF World Heavyweight Championship against Roddy Piper. Another featured match on the card saw The Fabulous Moolah avenge her loss to Richter by managing Leilani Kai to a victory over Richter for the WWF Women's Championship. The events in War to Settle the Score led directly to the first WrestleMania.

The event took place 9 days after Black Saturday and highlights from the event were shown on WWF World Championship Wrestling on WTBS.  Bob Backlund was on his way out of WWF after his five-year run as WWF Heavyweight Champion and moved to the NWA-AWA promotion Pro Wrestling USA; Backlund would not return to the WWF until 1992.  In January 1985 the North-South Connection of Adrian Adonis and Dick Murdoch would lose their WWF World Tag Team titles to Barry Windham and Mike Rotundo (the US Express).  Tito Santana would lose his Intercontinental title to Greg Valentine on an episode of Maple Leaf Wrestling in October of 1984.  

Antonio Inoki would retain the WWF World Martial Arts title (in 1985 the title became the property of New Japan Pro Wrestling after the WWF and NJPW ended their working arrangement) until losing it to Shota Chochishvili in April 1989, ending Inoki's 11 year run as champion. Inoki regained the title a month later and then NJPW retired the title in favor of the "Greatest 18 Championship".

Results

References

External links
 Results at Online World of Wrestling

1984 in professional wrestling
MTV original programming
Events in New York City
Women's professional wrestling shows
WWE shows
1984 in New York City
1980s in Manhattan
Madison Square Garden
Professional wrestling in New York City
July 1984 events in the United States
Women in WWE